The Community Futures Network of Canada is an extensive network of 269 community futures development corporations. The national Community Futures Program is administered by four regional development agencies, the Atlantic Canada Opportunities Agency (ACOA), Canadian Economic Development for Québec Regions (CED-Q), Western Economic Diversification Canada (WD), and the Federal Economic Development Initiative for Northern Ontario (FedNor) under Industry Canada (IC).  In Western Canada the Community Futures Program is delivered through a network of 90 non-profit organizations that are supported by four associations and one Pan-West Community Futures Network.

Community Futures in British Columbia 
The Community Futures Development Association of B.C. dba Community Futures British Columbia, is the provincial association for the 34 Community Futures offices located in British Columbia.  The 34 Community Futures Development Corporations provide rural communities with a variety of services including business development expertise and loans, technical support, training and information.  In addition to the business development component, Community Futures involve themselves in a wide array of community initiatives, including strategic planning processes, research and feasibility studies, and the implementation of a diverse range of community economic development projects.

Community Futures in Alberta  
The Community Futures Network of Alberta is the provincial association providing servant leadership to the 27 Community Futures offices located in rural Alberta.  

Each Alberta Community Futures is run by professional staff and operates on a non-profit basis, governed by a volunteer Board of Directors who are members of their local community.  Services offered by Community Futures to their rural Alberta clients include: 
 Free business tools and advice
 Business coaching and training
 Business loans and financing options
 Community Economic Development
 Programs for Entrepreneurs with Disabilities

In 2020 and 2021 during the COVID-19 Global Pandemic, Community Futures offices in Alberta issued several million dollars worth of relief loans to impacted businesses.

Community Futures in Manitoba 
The Community Futures Association of Manitoba, is the provincial association for the 16 Community Futures offices located within the province.  It is located in Winnipeg on Lombard Avenue.  The Community Futures Development Corporations provide rural communities with a variety of services including business development expertise and loans, technical support, training and information.  In addition to the business development component, Community Futures involve themselves in a wide array of community initiatives, including strategic planning processes, research and feasibility studies, and the implementation of a diverse range of community economic development projects.

Community Futures in Ontario 
The Ontario Association of Community Futures Development Corporations Inc. (OACFDC) is the provincial association for all offices located within the province.  The Community Futures Program is a Government of Canada initiative which supports 61 Community Futures Development Corporations (CFDCs) in Ontario— FedDev Ontario works with the 37 CFDCs in rural Eastern and Southern Ontario, while FedNor works with the 24 organizations in the North.

CFDCs offer a wide variety of programs and services supporting community economic development and small business growth.

In particular, they provide:
 Strategic community planning and socio-economic development;
 Support for community-based projects;
 Business information and planning services;
 Access to capital for small- and medium-sized businesses and social enterprises.
These community-based, not-for-profit organizations are staffed by professionals and are each governed by local volunteer boards of directors familiar with their communities' needs, concerns and future development priorities.

History 
In British Columbia, a 1980 pilot project established through the Nanaimo Community Employment Advisory Society on Vancouver Island provided the framework for what would later become Community Futures. It was the first federally funded employment project aimed at encouraging members of the local business community to participate in stimulating private sector employment.  In 1983, the government created Local Employment Assistance and Development corporations in economically depressed regions across Canada.  These LEAD corporations were later rolled into the Community Futures Program, which was announced in 1986 as part of the federal government's Canadian Jobs Strategy.  The initial objective was to address areas "of chronic and acute unemployment which, given the economic development trends, gave the program a rural orientation"

The Community Futures program model originally consisted of two organizations, each with their own Board of Directors and a distinct mandate.  One was the Business Development Centre, which provided the business support and loan functions performed by the original LEAD corporations, the second was the Community Futures Committee which was intended to assess the community's economic potential and areas of opportunity for job creation and business development.  These two organizations were expected to work closely with each other.

Governance
Community Futures offices operate under the guidance of a Board of Directors that is made up of members of the community.  These boards "build trust" with the local community, as they are composed or a range of private and public stakeholders from the local community.

References

Business planning
Entrepreneurship organizations
Business organizations based in Canada